Quaristice is the ninth studio album by British electronic music duo Autechre, initially released on 29 January 2008 by Warp Records. It was made available for download via bleep.com in FLAC and MP3 format on 29 January 2008 and then received a physical release on 3 March 2008.

Production
Autechre members Rob Brown and Sean Booth changed their approach for Quaristice, moving from a more deliberate studio process to a more spontaneous and "jam session" style of songwriting, approximately doubling the usual number of tracks per album to twenty. Booth said in a March 2008 interview, "a lot of the album tracks are edited-down jams; some of them hour-long pieces we made in a day and then worked them down ... We’d have a fifteen-minute jam, a ten- or a seven-minute and end up with a three- or four-minute track, and we just kept them all."
The album is accompanied with track-by-track artwork from The Designers Republic. The last thirty seconds of "The Plc" contain a brief repeated sample of Run–D.M.C.'s 1985 track "Here We Go".

Release
In an interview, Booth said "the actual product is the FLAC file – but I don't object to those who want to own something that they can hold." The album was also released as a 2-CD set with alternate versions of 11 tracks on a second 68-minute CD. The casing is a photo-etched, steel case and the release was limited to 1000 copies. The limited edition sold out within 12 hours of being announced.

Critical reception

Quaristice received somewhat positive reviews overall. Andy Kellman of AllMusic said that despite the large amount and short running time of the tracks, that "the ideas arrive fully formed, never appearing to be dashed off or loosely sketched, "and that "not since LP5 has being impressed been so obviously secondary to enjoyment." Mark Richardson of Pitchfork said that while the album was "in some ways the most listenable album [they'd] created in a decade," he warned that it was "ultimately no easier to parse, and can be very rough going indeed if you're not in the mood for their peculiar world." However, Andy Gill of The Independent gave a negative review, saying that the album found "the Autechre duo of Rob Brown and Sean Booth still searching vainly for structure and meaning among a largely impenetrable undergrowth of synthesized ticks and tones."

Track listing

Quaristice (Versions)
A second disc, entitled Quaristice (Versions), was included in the limited edition.

Release history

References

External links
 Listen to Quaristice at Bleep.com
 Quaristice at metacritic

Autechre albums
2008 albums
Warp (record label) albums
Albums with cover art by The Designers Republic